Mamadou Fofana may refer to:

 Mamadou Fofana (footballer, born 1988), French footballer
 Mamadou Fofana (footballer, born 1995), Ivorian footballer
 Mamadou Fofana (footballer, born 1998), Malian footballer
 Mamadou Fofana (footballer, born 2000), French footballer
 Mamadou Fofana (swimmer), Malian swimmer; see Mali at the 2011 World Aquatics Championships